Marcelo Martinessi is a Paraguayan filmmaker. His films include "Karai norte" (2009), "The Lost Voice" (2016), and The Heiresses, the latter being selected to compete for the Golden Bear at the 68th Berlin International Film Festival.

Filmography

 Los paraguayos (2007, documentary)
 Paraguay según Agustín Barrios (2007, documentary)
 Partida (2008, short film)
 Karai Norte (2009, short film)
 Calle Última (2011, short film)
 El baldío (2012, short film)
 Diario Guaraní (2016, documentary)
 La voz perdida (2017, short film)
 Las herederas (2018, feature film)

Awards

References 

1973 births
Living people
Paraguayan film directors
People from Asunción